The  is a professional wrestling tag team tournament held by Pro Wrestling Zero1. It was created in 2009.

It was preceded by the Passion Cup Tag Tournament in 2008, which was won by Kohei Sato and Ryouji Sai.

The Furinkazan was originally held in a round-robin format, with two points for a win, one for a draw and none for a loss. The teams finishing atop the two blocks advanced to the finals to determine the winner. However, since 2012 the tournament has been held in a single-elimination format under the name .

Results

List of winners
2009: Akebono & Shinjiro Otani
2010: Kamikaze & Kohei Sato
2011: Fujita Hayato & Masato Tanaka
2012: James Raideen & Zeus
2013: Daemon Ueda & Yusaku Obata
2014: Masato Tanaka &  Takashi Sugiura
2016: Kai & Yusaku Obata
2017: Shogun Okamoto & Yutaka Yoshie
2018: Kohei Sato & Sugi
2019: Yuji Hino & Yuji Okabayashi
2020: Shinjiro Otani & Yumehito Imanari
2021: Gajo & Tomohiko Hashimoto
2022: Yasu Kubota & Hide Kubota

2009
The 2009 Furinkazan featured two blocks of five and ran from December 9 through December 19. Winner, Akebono & Shinjiro Otani, went on to challenge and defeat Munenori Sawa & Ikuto Hidaka for NWA Intercontinental Tag Team titles.

2010
The 2010 Furinkazan featured two blocks of five and ran from December 11 through December 21. The tournament was contested for the vacant NWA Intercontinental Tag Team Championship.

2011
The 2011 Furinkazan featured two blocks of five and ran from December 8 through December 18.

2012
The 2012 Furinkazan was held from December 13 to December 15. For the first time, the tournament was held in a single-elimination format.

2013
The 2013 Furinkazan was held from December 1 through December 17.

2014
The 2014 Furinkazan was held from December 14 to December 24.

2016
The 2016 Furinkazan was held from December 10 to December 18.

2017
The 2017 Furinkazan was held from November 3 to November 23.

2018
The 2018 Furinkazan was held from December 9 to December 22.

2019
The 2019 Furinkazan was held from October 30 to November 17.

2020
The 2020 Furinkazan was held from December 6 to December 25.

2021
The 2021 Furinkazan will run from October 1 to November 12.

2022
The 2022 Furinkazan was held from November 11 to December 16.

First rounds (November 11)
Junya Matsunaga and Takafumi defeated Noriyuki Yoshida and Tsugutaka Sato (18:03)
Aja Kong and Satsuki Nagao defeated Voodoo Murders (Chris Vice and Yoshikazu Yokoyama) (10:52)
Masato Tanaka and Ryo Hoshino defeated Fuminori Abe and Takuya Sugawara (13:24)
Kubota Brothers (Hide Kubota and Yasu Kubota) defeated Leo Isaka and Shoki Kitamura (13:39)

Second rounds (November 20)
Takumi Sakurai and Tomohiko Hashimoto defeated Aja Kong and Satsuki Nagao (16:24)

Semifinals (November 26 and December 11)
Masato Tanaka and Ryo Hoshino defeated Takumi Sakurai and Tomohiko Hashimoto (11:46)
Kubota Brothers (Hide Kubota and Yasu Kubota) defeated Junya Matsunaga and Takafumi (13:59)

Final (December 16)
Kubota Brothers (Hide Kubota and Yasu Kubota) defeated Masato Tanaka and Ryo Hoshino (15:45)

See also
World's Strongest Tag Determination League
G1 Tag League
Professional wrestling in Japan
Global Tag League

References

External links

http://www.cagematch.net/?id=26&nr=2488
http://www.cagematch.net/?id=26&nr=2816
http://www.cagematch.net/?id=26&nr=3142

Pro Wrestling Zero1
Tag team tournaments